Angeline Murimirwa ( Mugwendere) is a Zimbabwean feminist, who is the executive director for Camfed in Africa. Murimirwa was included in the 2017 BBC 100 Women list of the most influential women.

Career
Murimirwa grew up in Denhere in rural Zimbabwe. In the 1990s, she was one of the first girls to be given a scholarship by Camfed for her secondary school education, which included monetary support, her school uniform, shoes and schooling equipment.

Before her appointment as executive director – Africa,  Murimirwa worked as the regional executive director for Camfed in Southern & Eastern Africa. In 1998, Murimirwa was helped set up the Camfed Alumnae Network (CAMA), which began with a few hundred women. By 2012, CAMA had 17,000 members in five African countries. The network celebrated 100,000 members in 2017. In 2005, Murimirwa presented at a Global Exchange forum, and in 2006, she was awarded the prize for Women's Creativity in Rural Life by the Women's World Summit Foundation. Murimirwa was featured in the 2009 book Half the Sky by Pulitzer Prize winning novelists Sheryl WuDunn and Nicholas Kristof. In 2014, she spoke at an event with Michelle Obama. In 2016, Murimirwa attended a Camfed event where Julia Gillard, former Prime Minister of Australia, became a patron of the organisation. During the event, Murimirwa stated that "Locally tailored solutions, respectful of context and building on local resources, are key to our success." In 2017, she was awarded the 2017 Diamond Ball Honors Award by the Clara Lionel Foundation. At the event, Murimirwa spoke about her personal journey from poverty to her current role at Camfed, and Murimirwa dedicated the award to the "100,000 Camfed Alumnae members". The event was attended by celebrities including Dave Chappelle, Rihanna, Kendrick Lamar, and Calvin Harris.  In 2018, during a Royal Visit to Zambia, Prince Harry met with Murimirwa. In 2020, Murimirwa was awarded the Yidan Prize for promoting development of education.

Personal life
Murimirwa is married with four children.

References

Zimbabwean feminists
Zimbabwean women in business
1980s births
BBC 100 Women
Living people